Sun Qiuting (born 22 September 1985) is a Chinese synchronized swimmer.

She represented China at the 2008 Summer Olympics, where she won a bronze medal.

Artistic Swimming Career

Olympic Games 
2008 Summer Olympics (Beijing, China)

References

China at the 2008 Summer Olympics

1985 births
Living people
Chinese synchronized swimmers
Olympic bronze medalists for China
Olympic synchronized swimmers of China
Synchronized swimmers at the 2008 Summer Olympics
Olympic medalists in synchronized swimming
Asian Games medalists in artistic swimming
Artistic swimmers at the 2006 Asian Games
Medalists at the 2008 Summer Olympics
Synchronized swimmers from Shanghai
Asian Games gold medalists for China
Medalists at the 2006 Asian Games